CMPA may stand for one of the following:

Canadian Medical Protective Association
Centre for Music and Performing Arts
Center for Media and Public Affairs
The Christadelphian Magazine & Publishing Association, CMPA.
Madison Railroad (reporting mark CMPA)
4-chloro-2-methylphenoxyacetic acid (CMPA), a herbicide
Cow's milk protein allergy, an allergic reaction to milk.